George W. Cross (c. 1873 - 12 August 1949) was an Australian actor and casting director. For many years he was a leading actor, producer and director on stage, including a stint in San Francisco.

He first came to Australia around the turn of the 20th century and at one time managed stage actress Nellie Bramley. In the 1930s, he was in charge of casting at Cinesound Productions where his discoveries included Jocelyn Howarth and Shirley Ann Richards.

Selected Credits

The Squatter's Daughter (1907) (play) – actor
The Squatter's Daughter (1910) – actor
The Ever Open Door (1914) - actor
The Mutiny of the Bounty (1916) – actor (as Captain Bligh)

References

External links

Australian theatre credits at AusStage

1870s births
1949 deaths
20th-century Australian male actors